Alan Daniel Murillo Orozco (born 28 January 2002) is a Mexican footballer who currently plays as a forward for Universidad Guadalajara.

Career statistics

Club

Notes

References

2002 births
Living people
Association football forwards
Leones Negros UdeG footballers
Tercera División de México players
Footballers from Jalisco
People from Zapopan, Jalisco
21st-century Mexican people
Mexican footballers